The 2014 Indian general election polls in Nagaland for Lok Sabha (lower house) seats were held in a single phase on 9 April 2014.

The main political parties in Nagaland were Nagaland Peoples Front (NPF) and Indian National Congress (INC).

Despite threats from insurgent militant groups in Northeast India, people turned out in large numbers for voting. Voters turnout in Nagaland was more than 87% which was highest in entire India.

Opinion polling

Election schedule

Constituency wise Election schedule are given below –

Results
The results of the elections will be declared on 16 May 2014.

Bye-election

References

2014 in Nagaland
Indian general elections in Nagaland
2010s in Nagaland
Nag